South Jersey Regional Airport  is a public use airport in Lumberton Township, Burlington County, New Jersey, United States. Owned by the New Jersey Department of Transportation, the airport is located four nautical miles (7 km) southwest of the central business district of Mount Holly, New Jersey. This facility is included in the National Plan of Integrated Airport Systems for 2011–2015, which categorized it as a general aviation reliever airport.

Although many U.S. airports use the same three-letter location identifier for the FAA and IATA, this airport is assigned VAY by the FAA and LLY by the IATA. The airport's ICAO identifier is KVAY.

Facilities and aircraft 
South Jersey Regional Airport covers an area of 642 acres (260 ha) at an elevation of 53 feet (16 m) above mean sea level. It has one runway designated 8/26 with an asphalt surface measuring 3,881 by 50 feet (1,183 x 15 m).

For the 12-month period ending August 26, 2008, the airport had 31,234 aircraft operations, an average of 85 per day: 97% general aviation and 3% air taxi. At that time there were 92 aircraft based at this airport: 92% single-engine and 8% multi-engine.

South Jersey Regional Airport is the headquarters for Beyond Aviation, a flight school and aircraft rental center based at the airport.

See also 
 List of airports in New Jersey

References

External links 

 Beyond Aviation
 South Jersey Regional Airport (VAY) from New Jersey DOT Airport Directory
 Aerial image as of March 1995 from USGS The National Map
 

Airports in New Jersey
Transportation buildings and structures in Burlington County, New Jersey